Fairfield is a district in the town of Buxton in the High Peak district of Derbyshire, England.  The district of Fairfield contains nine listed buildings that are recorded in the National Heritage List for England.  All the listed buildings are designated at Grade II, the lowest of the three grades, which is applied to "buildings of national importance and special interest".  Apart from a church, all the listed buildings are houses, farmhouses or cottages.


Buildings

References

Citations

Sources

 

Lists of listed buildings in Derbyshire